Clancy Mack (born 9 December 1955) is a former West Indian cricket umpire. He stood in one ODI game in 2001.

See also
 List of One Day International cricket umpires

References

1955 births
Living people
West Indian One Day International cricket umpires